Junction 8 (stylised as JUNCTI8N) is a popular heartland shopping mall located in the centre of Bishan. It is located outside Bishan MRT station and Bishan Bus Interchange. The name of this shopping centre was derived from the old station numbering of the North South line sector of nearby Bishan (N8).

History
Completed in November 1993 and officially opened in January 1994 by then Minister for Home Affairs Wong Kan Seng, Junction 8 was developed as a joint venture between Singapore Technologies Industrial Corporation (STIC) and Liang Court Holdings. When it first opened, it had 73 tenants, such as a Daimaru department store and supermarket, a Golden Village cineplex, Food Junction's first outlet, a duplex level SAFE Superstore and various specialty shops settling in a mall environment for the first time.

In 2004, the mall had an expansion block expanded to accommodate more retail spaces and a linkbridge was built, connecting to the car park opposite the mall. Daimaru was replaced by NTUC FairPrice and Seiyu (now BHG) during the former's exit from Singapore in 2003. The roof garden was relocated from Level 2 to Level 3, equipped with a children's playground and an event plaza. Also, the office tower space was decanted into the retail mall, and was subsequently leased to voluntary welfare organisations. In 2013, it underwent a major renovation, repainting its exterior and refreshing the interior of the mall. The children's playground was also renovated. The mall's basement was connected to the southbound platform of Bishan MRT station.

See also
 List of shopping malls in Singapore

References

External links
 

CapitaLand
Buildings and structures in Bishan, Singapore
Shopping malls in Singapore
Tourist attractions in Central Region, Singapore
1994 establishments in Singapore